Youakim Moubarac (July 20, 1924 – May 24, 1995) was a Lebanese French scholar. He was an Islamologist, an Arabist and a disciple of the Orientalist Louis Massignon and of philosopher Louis Gardet. A Maronite priest, Moubarac dedicated his life and major works to interfaith dialogue between Christianity and Islam, to Arab and Lebanese causes, to the unity of the Church and to the Maronite Church Antiochian heritage.

Biography
Youakim Moubarac was born in Kfarsghab, Zgharta, Lebanon in a Maronite family of long sacerdotal tradition. His Father, Antoun, and Grandfather, Youssef, were Maronite priests serving their community in one of the holiest locations of the Eastern Christianity in the Middle East, the Qadisha Valley. His maternal grandfather Nemtallah Samia was also a priest.

Early life
After ecclesiastic studies in the Maronite Seminary of Ghazir and the Université Saint-Joseph, Beirut, Lebanon, young Youakim was sent in October 1945 to France by his superiors. Once his studies ended in the Seminary of Saint Sulpice, Paris, he was ordained priest on June 29, 1947 in Lebanon. In 1948, he was authorized by the Maronite Patriarch to continue his studies at the Institut Catholique de Paris. In that same year, he is appointed at the service of the Church of Saint Séverin in the Quartier Latin, Paris where he stayed for 18 years.

Expanded description
In 1951, he presented his first Ph.D. thesis Abraham dans le Coran and joined as a researcher the Centre national de la recherche scientifique, the largest public research organization in France.   
    
From 1950 till 1962, Fr. Moubarac assumed the secretariat of Louis Massignon. In 1959, he started his academic career, teaching Classical Arabic at the Institut Catholique de Paris. Till his death, he taught in several universities such as the Université catholique de Louvain, Belgium, the University of Paris IV: Paris-Sorbonne and others.   
   
He participated between 1962 and 1965 in the Second Vatican Council within the Maronite delegation. After 1965, he dedicated himself to his work of promotion of the Interfaith dialogue, of defense of the Palestinian and especially Lebanese causes from 1975.   
    
From 1985, Father Youakim worked on the rediscovering of the spiritual Syriac roots of the Maronite Church. Between 1987 and 1992, he settled in Lebanon and was in charge of preparing for a Maronite Synod.   
   
During this period, and despite an intensive work on the Synod preparation and many spiritual and political missions, Moubarac started two important projects:   
 In 1989, he started the restoration of the Monastery of Our Lady of Qannoubine, a historical Maronite Monastery in the Qadisha valley which was for centuries the See of the Maronite Patriarch (ca. 15th to 18th Century).
 In 1992, he founded with some friends, The Lebanese Cooperative for Development, a microcredit initiative, whose objectives were to encourage the displaced families during the Lebanese Civil War (1975–1990) to settle back in their region of origin and to prevent emigration outside Lebanon.
   
In 1991, the decision of Pope John Paul II to convene a Synod in Rome for all Catholic Lebanese Churches cancelled his project.   
   
In 1992, he settled back in Paris where he resumed his academic work.

Death and afterward
Father Youakim died on May 24, 1995 in Montpellier, France. His burial took place at the graveyard of the Abbaye Notre-Dame-de-Jouarre, France. Fourteen years later, on August 25, 2009, his remains were transferred, according to his wish, to rest beside his relatives in Mar Youssef Church in Morh Kfarsghab. A solemn mass of requiem, in his home town of Kfarsghab was presided by the Maronite Patriarch Cardinal Mar Nasrallah Boutros Sfeir, honored by the presence of the Minister of Information, M. Tarek Mitri representing the President of the Lebanese Republic, General Michel Suleiman, the family and friends.

Notes

Works
Youakim Moubarac left important works, large parts of which remain unpublished. In 2005 and 2006, two books were published with some of his previously unpublished works:
 Georges Corm (2004), Youakim Moubarac, Un homme d'exception, Librairie Orientale, Beirut, 
 Dossier dirigé par Jean Stassinet (2005), Youakim Moubarac, Editions L'Age d'Homme, Lausanne,

Published works
 1956, Bibliographie de Louis Massignon. Réunie et classée par Y. Moubarac, Institut Français de Damas, Damascus. 
 1956, Les Noms divins dans le Coran et en épigraphie sud-sémitique, Museon, Louvain.
 1957, Les Études d'épigraphie sud-sémitique et la naissance de l'Islam : Eléments de bibliographie et lignes de recherches, Librairie orientaliste Paul Geuthner, 
 1958, Abraham dans le Coran, Editions J. Vrin, Paris. 
 1962, L'Islam, Castermann, Paris. 
 1963, Anthologie de la littérature arabe, selon une nouvelle translittération établie par le Cardinal Tisserant, Gedalge, Paris. 
 1963, Catéchisme pour adultes à Saint-Séverin, Casterman, 
 1963, Mémorial Louis Massignon, Sous la direction de Youakim Moubarac et des textes arabes de Ibrahim Madkour, Abd al-Rahman Badawi, Taha Hussein, etc., Dar el-Salam, Imprimerie de l'Institut Français d'Archéologie Orientale, Cairo. 
 1964, Guide de l'église Saint-Séverin (XIIIe-XVIe siècles) Deuxième édition revue avec textes en espagnol, italien, anglais et allemand, Association Philippe Néri, Paris. 
 1965, Bible, Liturgy, and Dogma, Notre Dame, Ind., Fides Publishers,
 1965, Saint-Séverin catechism for adults, G. Chapman, London, 
 1965, Calendrier synoptique, juif, chrétien, musulman 1966, Devrue, Paris. 
 1966, I Believe in God, Notre Dame, Ind., Fides Publishers. 
 1966, Calendrier Synoptique, juif, chrétien, musulman, Philippe Néri, Saint Séverin, Paris.
 1968, Vocation islamique de Jérusalem, Al Khal Editor, Beirut. 
 1969, La Pensée chrétienne et l'Islam, des origines jusqu'a la prise de Constantinople, Sorbonne, Paris.
 1971, Les Musulmans: consultation islamo-chrétienne, Seven Muslim intellectuals from North Africa, Egypt, Iran, and India replies to questions concerning relations with Christians., Beauchesne, Paris. 
 1972, Pentalogie Islamo-chrétienne, 5 tomes :
 tome 1 : L’œuvre de Louis Massignon, 
 tome 2 : Le Coran et la critique occidentale, 
 tome 3 : L’Islam et le dialogue Islamo-Chrétien, 
 tome 4 : Les Chrétiens et le Monde Arabe, 
 tome 5 : Palestine et Arabité., . Editions du Cénacle Libanais, Beirut.
 1977, Recherches sur la pensée chrétienne et l'Islam dans les temps modernes et à l'époque contemporaine, Université libanaise, Beirut. 
 1975, Muhammad est-il prophète?, Louvain-La-Neuve, Université catholique de Louvain, Faculté de théologie, 
 1982, Islam et Christianisme en dialogue, Cerf, Paris. 
 1984, Pentalogie antiochienne, Domaine Maronite, 5 tomes en 7 volumes:
 tome 1 : les Maronites entre l'Orient syrien et l'Occident Latin, 
 tome 2 : le Liban entre l'Islam, la France et l'arabité, 
 tome 3 : hommes et institutions, us et coutumes, proverbes et dictons, recettes et chansons, 
 tome 4 : répertoire du Liban, 
 tome 5 : livre d'heures et de mélodies, 
 tome 6 : livre du pain et du vin, 
 tome 7 : livre d'images,  Publications du cénacle libanais, Beirut.
 1986, La Pensée Chrétienne et l’Islam, Université libanaise, Beirut.
 1993, La chambre nuptiale du coeur, Approches spirituelles et questionnements de l'Orient syriani, Cariscript, Paris, 
 1993, La Question libanaise dans les textes du Patriarche Sfeir, Cariscript, Paris. 
 1996, al-Quds—al-qaḍīyah  , al-Markaz al-Raʼīsī, Beirut,

References
 Antoine Fleyfel, La théologie contextuelle arabe. Modèle libanais, Paris, L'Harmattan, 2011. .

External links
 The Lebanese Cooperative for Development, an initiative of Youakim Moubarac.
 Association des Amis de Youakim Moubarac
 Texts on Youakim Moubarac
 Ehden Family Tree

1924 births
1995 deaths
Syriacists
Lebanese Arabists
Institut Catholique de Paris alumni
Lebanese Maronites
Christian writers
Lebanese writers
Lebanese academics
Academic staff of the University of Paris
20th-century Lebanese historians
People from Zgharta District
Academic staff of the Institut Catholique de Paris
Academic staff of the Université catholique de Louvain